The heating value (or energy value or calorific value) of a substance, usually a fuel or food (see food energy), is the amount of heat released during the combustion of a specified amount of it.

The calorific value is the total energy released as heat when a substance undergoes complete combustion with oxygen under standard conditions. The chemical reaction is typically a hydrocarbon or other organic molecule reacting with oxygen to form carbon dioxide and water and release heat. It may be expressed with the quantities:

 energy/mole of fuel 
 energy/mass of fuel
 energy/volume of the fuel

There are two kinds of enthalpy of combustion, called high(er) and low(er) heat(ing) value, depending on how much the products are allowed to cool and whether compounds like  are allowed to condense. 
The high heat values are conventionally measured with a bomb calorimeter. Low heat values are calculated from high heat value test data. They may also be calculated as the difference between the heat of formation ΔH of the products and reactants (though this approach is somewhat artificial since most heats of formation are typically calculated from measured heats of combustion).

By convention, the (higher) heat of combustion is defined to be the heat released for the complete combustion of a compound in its standard state to form stable products in their standard states:  hydrogen is converted to water (in its liquid state), carbon is converted to carbon dioxide gas, and nitrogen is converted to nitrogen gas.  That is, the heat of combustion, ΔH°comb, is the heat of reaction of the following process:  

  (std.) + (c +  - )  (g) → c (g) +  (l) +  (g) 

Ways of determination

Gross and net
Zwolinski and Wilhoit defined, in 1972, "gross" and "net" values for heats of combustion. In the gross definition the products are the most stable compounds, e.g. (l), (l), (s) and (l). In the net definition the products are the gases produced when the compound is burned in an open flame, e.g. (g), (g), (g) and (g). In both definitions the products for C, F, Cl and N are (g), (g), (g) and (g), respectively.

Dulong's Formula

The heating value of a fuel can be calculated with the results of ultimate analysis of fuel. From analysis, percentages of the combustibles in the fuel (carbon, hydrogen, sulfur) are known. Since the heat of combustion of these elements is known, the heating value can be calculated using Dulong's Formula:

LHV [kJ/g]= 33.87mC + 122.3(mH - mO ÷ 8) + 9.4mS

where mC, mH, mO, mN, and mS are the contents of carbon, hydrogen, oxygen, nitrogen, and sulfur on any (wet, dry or ash free) basis, respectively.

Higher heating value 
The higher heating value (HHV; gross energy, upper heating value, gross calorific value GCV, or higher calorific value; HCV) indicates the upper limit of the available thermal energy produced by a complete combustion of fuel. It is measured as a unit of energy per unit mass or volume of substance. The HHV is determined by bringing all the products of combustion back to the original pre-combustion temperature, and in particular condensing any vapor produced. This is the same as the thermodynamic heat of combustion since the enthalpy change for the reaction assumes a common temperature of the compounds before and after combustion, in which case the water produced by combustion is condensed to a liquid. The higher heating value takes into account the latent heat of vaporization of water in the combustion products, and is useful in calculating heating values for fuels where condensation of the reaction products is practical (e.g., in a gas-fired boiler used for space heat). In other words, HHV assumes all the water component is in liquid state at the end of combustion (in product of combustion) and that heat delivered at temperatures below  can be put to use.

Lower heating value 
The lower heating value (LHV; net calorific value; NCV, or lower calorific value; LCV) is another measure of available thermal energy produced by a combustion of fuel, measured as a unit of energy per unit mass or volume of substance. In contrast to the HHV, the LHV considers energy losses such as the energy used to vaporize water - although its exact definition is not uniformly agreed upon. One definition is simply to subtract the heat of vaporization of the water from the higher heating value. This treats any H2O formed as a vapor. The energy required to vaporize the water therefore is not released as heat.

LHV calculations assume that the water component of a combustion process is in vapor state at the end of combustion, as opposed to the higher heating value (HHV) (a.k.a. gross calorific value or gross CV) which assumes that all of the water in a combustion process is in a liquid state after a combustion process.

This means that the latent heat of vaporization of water and other reaction products is not recovered. It is useful in comparing fuels where condensation of the combustion products is impractical, or heat at a temperature below  cannot be put to use.

Another definition, used by Gas Processors Suppliers Association (GPSA) and originally used by API (data collected for API research project 44), is the enthalpy of all combustion products minus the enthalpy of the fuel at the reference temperature (API research project 44 used 25 °C. GPSA currently uses 60 °F), minus the enthalpy of the stoichiometric oxygen (O2) at the reference temperature, minus the heat of vaporization of the vapor content of the combustion products.

The definition in which the combustion products are all returned to the reference temperature is more easily calculated from the higher heating value than when using other definitions and will in fact give a slightly different answer.

Gross heating value 
Gross heating value accounts for water in the exhaust leaving as vapor, as does LHV, but gross heating value also includes liquid water in the fuel prior to combustion. This value is important for fuels like wood or coal, which will usually contain some amount of water prior to burning.

Measuring heating values 
The higher heating value is experimentally determined in a bomb calorimeter. When hydrogen and oxygen react during combustion, water vapor is produced. The vessel and its contents are then cooled to the original 25 °C and the higher heating value is determined as the heat released between identical initial and final temperatures.

When the lower heating value (LHV) is determined, cooling is stopped at 150 °C and the reaction heat is only partially recovered. The limit of 150 °C is based on acid gas dew-point.

Note: Higher heating value (HHV) is calculated with the product of water being in liquid form while lower heating value (LHV) is calculated with the product of water being in vapor form.

Relation between heating values 
The difference between the two heating values depends on the chemical composition of the fuel. In the case of pure carbon or carbon monoxide, the two heating values are almost identical, the difference being the sensible heat content of carbon dioxide between 150 °C and 25 °C (sensible heat exchange causes a change of temperature, while latent heat is added or subtracted for phase transitions at constant temperature. Examples: heat of vaporization or heat of fusion). For hydrogen, the difference is much more significant as it includes the sensible heat of water vapor between 150 °C and 100 °C, the latent heat of condensation at 100 °C, and the sensible heat of the condensed water between 100 °C and 25 °C. All in all, the higher heating value of hydrogen is 18.2% above its lower heating value (142MJ/kg vs. 120MJ/kg). For hydrocarbons, the difference depends on the hydrogen content of the fuel. For gasoline and diesel the higher heating value exceeds the lower heating value by about 10% and 7%, respectively, and for natural gas about 11%.

A common method of relating HHV to LHV is:
 
where Hv is the heat of vaporization of water, n,out is the number of moles of water vaporized and nfuel,in is the number of moles of fuel combusted.

 Most applications that burn fuel produce water vapor, which is unused and thus wastes its heat content. In such applications, the lower heating value must be used to give a 'benchmark' for the process. 
 However, for true energy calculations in some specific cases, the higher heating value is correct. This is particularly relevant for natural gas, whose high hydrogen content produces much water, when it is burned in condensing boilers and power plants with flue-gas condensation that condense the water vapor produced by combustion, recovering heat which would otherwise be wasted.

Usage of terms 
Engine manufacturers typically rate their engines fuel consumption by the lower heating values since the exhaust is never condensed in the engine, and doing this allows them to publish more attractive numbers than are used in conventional power plant terms.  The conventional power industry had used HHV (high heat value) exclusively for decades, even though virtually all of these plants did not condense exhaust either. American consumers should be aware that the corresponding fuel-consumption figure based on the higher heating value will be somewhat higher.

The difference between HHV and LHV definitions causes endless confusion when quoters do not bother to state the convention being used. since there is typically a 10% difference between the two methods for a power plant burning natural gas. For simply benchmarking part of a reaction the LHV may be appropriate, but HHV should be used for overall energy efficiency calculations if only to avoid confusion, and in any case, the value or convention should be clearly stated.

Accounting for moisture 
Both HHV and LHV can be expressed in terms of AR (all moisture counted), MF and MAF (only water from combustion of hydrogen). AR, MF, and MAF are commonly used for indicating the heating values of coal:

 AR (as received) indicates that the fuel heating value has been measured with all moisture- and ash-forming minerals present.
 MF (moisture-free) or dry indicates that the fuel heating value has been measured after the fuel has been dried of all inherent moisture but still retaining its ash-forming minerals.
 MAF (moisture- and ash-free) or DAF (dry and ash-free) indicates that the fuel heating value has been measured in the absence of inherent moisture- and ash-forming minerals.

Heat of combustion tables 

 Note
 There is no difference between the lower and higher heating values for the combustion of carbon, carbon monoxide and sulfur since no water is formed during the combustion of those substances.
 BTU/lb values are calculated from MJ/kg (1 MJ/kg = 430 BTU/lb).

Higher heating values of natural gases from various sources 
The International Energy Agency reports the following typical higher heating values per Standard cubic metre of gas:

 Algeria: 39.57MJ/Sm3
 Bangladesh: 36.00MJ/Sm3
 Canada: 39.00MJ/Sm3
 China: 38.93MJ/Sm3
 Indonesia: 40.60MJ/Sm3
 Iran: 39.36MJ/Sm3
 Netherlands: 33.32MJ/Sm3
 Norway: 39.24MJ/Sm3
 Pakistan: 34.90MJ/Sm3
 Qatar: 41.40MJ/Sm3
 Russia: 38.23MJ/Sm3
 Saudi Arabia: 38.00MJ/Sm3
 Turkmenistan: 37.89MJ/Sm3
 United Kingdom: 39.71MJ/Sm3
 United States: 38.42MJ/Sm3
 Uzbekistan: 37.89MJ/Sm3

The lower heating value of natural gas is normally about 90% of its higher heating value. This table is in Standard cubic metres (1atm, 15°C), to convert to values per Normal cubic metre (1atm, 0°C), multiply above table by 1.0549.

See also 

 Adiabatic flame temperature
 Cost of electricity by source
 Electrical efficiency
 Energy content of fuel
 Energy conversion efficiency
 Energy density
 Energy value of coal
 Exothermic reaction
 Figure of merit
 Fire
 Food energy
 Internal energy
 ISO 15971
 Mechanical efficiency
 Thermal efficiency
 Wobbe index: heat density

References

Further reading

External links 
 NIST Chemistry WebBook
 

Engineering thermodynamics
Combustion
Fuels
Thermodynamic properties
Nuclear physics
Thermochemistry